Joel Theissen (born 12 August 1986 in Windsor, New South Wales) is an Australian footballer who last played for GPS Portland Phoenix in the USL Premier Development League.

Career

Early career
A left-sided midfielder or defender, Thiessen attended the Australian Institute of Sport, and played with former NSL side Newcastle United, before catching the eye of Sydney FC head coach Terry Butcher. Thiessen was placed on a short-term contract the A-League club in September 2006 to cover for the injured Robbie Middleby, and played in one senior game for the team before leaving to play for Marconi Stallions and Sydney Olympic.

United States
In March 2008 Thiessen re-located to the United States to attend college at the University of New Mexico. After failing to be cleared by the NCAA clearinghouse he moved on to the University of Rio Grande in the NAIA. He played with the Cape Cod Crusaders in the USL Premier Development League during his 2008 collegiate off-season. In March 2009 he signed with the Ottawa Fury for the 2009 Premier Development League season, and played two seasons with the team, before moving to GPS Portland Phoenix in 2011.

External links
OzFootball profile
Australians playing abroad information
Player profile at crusaders website
Player season stats at Crusaders
New Mexico Golobos Profile

1986 births
Living people
Australian people of Dutch descent
Australian soccer players
Sydney FC players
Marconi Stallions FC players
Sydney Olympic FC players
A-League Men players
Cape Cod Crusaders players
Ottawa Fury (2005–2013) players
GPS Portland Phoenix players
USL League Two players
New Mexico Lobos men's soccer players
Association football midfielders
Rio Grande RedStorm men's soccer players
Australian expatriate soccer players
Expatriate soccer players in the United States
Australian expatriate sportspeople in the United States
Expatriate soccer players in Canada
Australian expatriate sportspeople in Canada